The Fun Cup is a one-make racing series created by Franz Dubois in 1997 in Belgium. The cars are identical, 180 bhp, 799 kg (1700 lb) Volkswagen Beetle replicas with all major components sealed to ensure the cars are technically identical and of equal performance. The tyres are a standard road radial which is specified to the series, and is run in both wet and dry.

The series is renowned for the competitiveness of the racing, as well as the friendliness and ease in which one can enter the races. It is, however, known mostly for the cost of entering; the Fun Cup is one of the cheapest options to involve oneself in motor racing. Cars cost around £29,600, which is usually split between the drivers. The races last mostly between three and six hours, split between a team of two or more drivers, so driving time in the Fun Cup is more than 8 times that offered by other series. There are Fun Cup national series competed in the UK, Belgium, France, Spain, Italy, Germany and the Canary Islands, all of which combine in the 25 Hours at the Circuit de Spa-Francorchamps.

The pinnacle of the series, the 25 Hours at Spa, is one of the longest continuous motor races in the world, with a grid size in 2006 of 152 cars. The grids are now capped at 155 cars, which is the practical limit of the Spa-Francorchamps circuit.

References

External links 
Fun Cup UK website
Fun Cup Germany website

European auto racing series
One-make series
Volkswagen Beetle